The Salesforce Tower is a skyscraper in Circular Quay, Sydney, New South Wales, Australia. Designed by Foster + Partners, the tower stands at a height of 263.1 metres, making it the tallest office building and the second-tallest building in Sydney. It is part of a A$5 billion redevelopment of the Circular Quay precinct, alongside the new buildings of Quay Quarter Tower, One Circular Quay, 56 Pitt Street, 200 George Street, the terminus of the new CBD and South East Light Rail and redevelopment of the ferry wharves.

The tower was developed by Lendlease. Construction began in late 2019, with the core of the tower topping out in February 2022. The tower officially opened to the public in November 2022.

Software company Salesforce acquired naming rights to the tower in late 2019 and will occupy 24 levels of the building upon its completion.

Construction

See also

Salesforce Tower
Salesforce Tower (Indianapolis)
Salesforce Tower (London)
List of tallest buildings in Sydney

References

Proposed buildings and structures in Sydney
Proposed skyscrapers in Australia
Salesforce
Skyscrapers in Sydney